Visoko is a village in the Municipality of Šenčur in the Upper Carniola region of Slovenia.

Geography
Visoko is a ribbon village along the road from Kranj to Zgornje Jezersko, with additional road connections to Cerklje na Gorenjskem, Šenčur, and Suha pri Predosljah. Significant construction of houses along the road to Cerklje na Gorenjskem took place after the Second World War. The Kokra River flows past the village to the west, where it powered two grain mills and a sawmill in the past. The highest elevation in the village is at Hrib Hill southeast of the village center.

Church

The local church is dedicated to Saint Vitus and was built in 1861 on the site of an earlier church.

Notable people
Notable people that were born or lived in Visoko include:
Peter Bohinjec (1864–1919), writer

References

External links

Visoko at Geopedia

Populated places in the Municipality of Šenčur